Yu Geun-Hyeong (유근형 ; 柳根瀅) (April 5, 1894 – January 20, 1993) was a master Korean ceramist and played a leading role in the revival of Goryeo celadon.

He first worked at the Hanyang Koryo Ceramics Factory run by the Japanese in Shindang-dong, Seoul. He scoured the Korean Peninsula in his research into kilns used for celadon. During the 1930s he achieved fame both in Korea and Japan by successfully reproducing celadon. He dedicated himself to the restoration of the celadon genre, working first at the Songbuk kiln at the Korea Arts and Culture Research Center at the Kansong Art Museum in 1954, and later at the Korean Formal Arts Research Center in Taebang-dong.

Beginning in the 1930s, he nearly single-handedly sought for the revival of traditional Koryo celadon.

His name is also written as Yu Geun-Hyeong or Yu Kun-hyong or Yoo Geun-hyung or Yoo Keun-Hyeong. The studio name is written as Haegang or Hae-Gang.

Biography 
He produced porcelain celadon from 1911 to 1945, and devoted his life to researching celadon across the country and resurrecting Goryeo celadon (청자장 ; 磁匠 ; Cheongjajang).

The name of his studio was Haegang (해강 ; 海剛), which was located in Gyeonggi Province outside Seoul.

He established the Haegang Research Institute in Shindun-myeon, Icheon in 1960, using the many materials he had collected over his decades of research in the field.

He was honored by the government as a Living National Treasure as holder of Intangible Cultural Property No.13 of Gyeonggi Province.

He founded the Haegang Pottery Art Gallery in 1990 in collaboration with his oldest son and successor, Yu Kwang-Ryeol (also written as Yoo / Yu Kwang-yul / Kwangyul / Gwang-yeol / Gwangyeol) (유광렬 ; 柳光烈). His son serves as the director of the Haegang Ceramics Museum. A film of the artist can be found here - YouTube. 

 The museum website can be found here: Haegang Ceramics Museum
A film illustrating the museum's collection can be found: Haegang Ceramics Museum - YouTube

His work was documented in the film Koryo Celadon in 1979, which was nominated for an Academy Award for Best Documentary Short.

 The film can be viewed here: Koryo Celadon,1979 - YouTube

His work is held in public collections, including The Asian Art Museum of San Francisco (object number 1992.232) and The British Museum (object number 1992,0623.1-2)

His two sons follow in their father's footsteps, devoting their craft to the development of traditional Korean ceramics.

Further reading 
 J Portal, 'Korea, Art and Archaeology', British Museum Publications, 2000.
Koryo celadon: The Autobiography of Haegang, Yoo, Keun-Hyeong, 1984.
Koreana, 1991. Vol 5, No 3. Page 68.

References 

1894 births
1993 deaths
South Korean ceramists
South Korean potters
20th-century ceramists